Phocageneus is an extinct genus of river dolphin belonging to Squalodelphinidae. Specimens have been found in the middle Miocene Calvert Formation of Maryland and Virginia.

References 

Miocene cetaceans
Prehistoric cetacean genera
Miocene mammals of North America
Paleontology in Maryland
Paleontology in Virginia
Fossil taxa described in 1869
Taxa named by Joseph Leidy